Pat Bishow is an American independent filmmaker and writer, and former drummer for The Mosquitos.

In 2015 he created a web series We Might Be Superheroes about two women that accidentally become superheroes.  Comically known as "the odd couple in tights."  It ran for 3 seasons on Amazon Prime.
 
His 2009 film is called The Adventures of C.C. Brite and stars Jessica Jolly.  The story is a throw-back to the old girl detective books from the 60s (Nancy Drew/Trixie Beldon/Kate Aldrich/Honey West/etc.).

The latest film that he acted in, wrote and directed was It's a Haunted Happenin'! which was released in 2003. He is married and has a son whose name is Declan, named after Elvis Costello.

His largest and most successful movie series is "The Adventures of El Frenetico & Go-Girl." They are about a luchador who is often too drunk to fight and a female martial arts master who always saves the day.

Bibliography 
 Gods in Spandex, Or, A Survivors' Account of 80's Cinema Obscura (2007/Succubus Press)
-Bishow contributed a piece on Soultangler.

External links 
 
 Pat Bishow New York Times Filmography
 "Getting in H*A*R*M's Way", interview by Nathan Cherubino, Cashiers du Cinemart, Issue 11. Retrieved April 19, 2007. 
 "The Adventures of El Frenetico and Go-Girl" Review, b-independent.com. Retrieved April 19, 2007. 
 "It's a Haunted Happenin'!" Review, b-independent.com. Retrieved April 19, 2007. 
 "The Adventures of El Frenetico and Go Girl", Teleport City review December 12, 2001. Retrieved April 19, 2007. 
 "Adventures of El Frenetico and Go-Girl", Review by John Oak Dalton, Micro Cinema Scene, 2003-01-23. Retrieved April 19, 2007.

Living people
Year of birth missing (living people)